Machata is a surname. Notable people with the surname include:

 Karol Machata (1928–2016), Slovak actor
 Manuel Machata (born 1984), German bobsledder
 Mark Ivan Machata (Born 1969),American Author,Retired GM Corvette Mechanic(2019),Future EV Sector/Healthcare CEO,Automotive Laureate.

See also
 Machat
 Machate
 Machatas (disambiguation)